The 1957 Hong Kong Urban Council election was held on 8 March 1957 for the four of the eight elected seats of the Urban Council of Hong Kong. Since this election the term of the members was extended from two years to four years.

6,916 of the 19,305 eligible voters cast their ballots. Two incumbents of the Hong Kong Civic Association, Li Yiu-bor and Woo Pak-foo who won their seats last year retained their seats, while Hilton Cheong-Leen gained a seat for the Civic Association by defeating incumbent Woo Pak-chuen, Woo Pak-foo's brother, of the Reform Club of Hong Kong and took the last seat.

Results

By-election
An extraordinary Urban Council Election took place on 12 June 1957 due to Brook Bernacchi resigned with the allegations of over-expenditure on election. Bernacchi stood as a candidate again, facing the challenge from Civic Association's K. B. Allport who was unelected in March. Bernacchi defeated Allport with 2,590 to 1,486 votes.

Citations

References
 Lau, Y.W. (2002). A history of the municipal councils of Hong Kong : 1883-1999 : from the Sanitary Board to the Urban Council and the Regional Council. Leisure and Cultural Service Dept. 
 Pepper, Suzanne (2008). Keeping Democracy at Bay:Hong Kong and the Challenge of Chinese Political Reform. Rowman & Littlefield.

1957 elections in Asia
1957 in Hong Kong
Urban
March 1957 events in Asia
1957 elections in the British Empire